Adambar Ukkadai  is a village in the Kudavasal taluk of Tiruvarur district in Tamil Nadu, India.

Demographics 

As per the 2001 census, Adambar Ukkadai had a population of 4,540 with 2,230 males and 2,310 females. The sex ratio was 1036.

References 

 

Villages in Tiruvarur district